Ishita Roy is the Agriculture Production Commissioner Kerala (APC) of the Government of Kerala.

Prior to this, Roy had served as the Joint Secretary of the Ministry of Human Resource Development for Higher education,  CEO & Member Secretary of the Central Silk Board of India in Bangalore, which is under the purview of the Indian Ministry of Textiles.

Roy entered the Indian Administrative Service (IAS) during 1991 under the Kerala cadre batch.

References

Women in Delhi politics
Living people
Women in Kerala politics
People from New Delhi
21st-century Indian women politicians
21st-century Indian politicians
Year of birth missing (living people)